James Douglas Edgar (30 September 1884 – 8 August 1921) was an English professional golfer and golf writer.

Early life
Edgar was born in Newcastle upon Tyne, England. He won the French Open in 1914. He coached the young player Tommy Armour, who became a prominent professional after 1920; Armour later praised Edgar as having helped him the most. The legendary Harry Vardon stated that Edgar was on his way to becoming a player who could surpass everyone.

Golf career
Edgar emigrated to the United States in April 1919, following World War I. He was the head professional at Druid Hills Golf Club in Atlanta. Edgar played frequently with the young Bobby Jones at the Atlanta Athletic Club (the site of today's East Lake Golf Club) from 1919–1921. He mentored and coached Jones during this period as well. Jones developed into one of the dominant golfers of the 1920s. Edgar was a friend of Alexa Stirling and gave her golf lessons while he was the professional at Druid Hills.

Edgar won the Canadian Open in 1919 at the Hamilton Golf and Country Club by a record 16 strokes (a winning margin which still stands for a PGA Tour event),  with Jones and Jim Barnes tying for second, and came back the next year to win that title again. He lost the 1920 PGA Championship, one of golf's majors, in a match play final to Jock Hutchison. During 1919–20, Edgar was among the top players in the world.

Edgar wrote a golf book entitled The Gate to Golf, based on his discoveries made in England. Edgar had an ailing hip which he could not turn freely. Through experimentation, he found that a restricted hip turn still allowed a repeatable swing with excellent power and control. This book proved to have significant impact on golf instruction, right up to the present time.

Death
Edgar's death was mysterious. He was found late at night on an Atlanta street, bleeding heavily from a deep wound in his leg, and died in the street before any trained help could arrive. The case was turned over to police but never solved. He left a wife and two children in England. In an article published in Sports Illustrated in April 2010, writer Steve Eubanks wrote that Edgar was having an affair with a married Atlanta woman, and that this likely played a central role in Edgar's death. Eubanks' article was an excerpt from his book To Win and Die in Dixie, a biography of Edgar published later that year. Edgar was buried in Westview Cemetery in Atlanta.

Tournament wins (4)

PGA Tour wins (3)
1919 Canadian Open
1920 Canadian Open, Southern Open

Other wins (1)
this list may be incomplete
1914 French Open

Results in major championships

Note: The Masters Tournament was not founded until 1934.

NYF = Tournament not yet founded
NT = No tournament
CUT = missed the half-way cut
R32, R16, QF, SF = Round in which player lost in PGA Championship match play
"T" indicates a tie for a place

See also
List of unsolved murders

References

Books

English male golfers
PGA Tour golfers
Golf writers and broadcasters
British people murdered abroad
People murdered in Georgia (U.S. state)
Unsolved murders in the United States
Sportspeople from Newcastle upon Tyne
1884 births
1921 deaths